The Georgetown Tigers are the athletic teams that represent Georgetown College located in Georgetown, Kentucky, in intercollegiate sports as a member of the National Association of Intercollegiate Athletics (NAIA), primarily competing in the Mid-South Conference (MSC) since the 1995–96 academic year. The Tigers previously competed in the Kentucky Intercollegiate Athletic Conference (KIAC; now currently known as the River States Conference (RSC) since the 2016–17 school year) from 1916–17 to 1994–95.

Attempt to move to NCAA Division II
On April 28, 2012, the college officially announced that after a year-long study, it had decided to transfer its athletics program to NCAA Division II. It was presumed they would join the newly formed Great Midwest Athletic Conference (G-MAC). However, on July 24, 2012, the college announced that its application to join the NCAA was denied. The membership committee had notified them on July 12 that "it felt that Georgetown College was not ready to enter the process at this time." As of 2021, Georgetown hasn't yet re-applied to transition into NCAA Division II.

Varsity teams
Georgetown competes in 22 intercollegiate varsity sports: Men's sports include baseball, basketball, cross country, football, golf, soccer, tennis, track & field (indoor and outdoor) and volleyball; while women's sports include basketball, cross country, golf, lacrosse, soccer, softball, tennis, track & field (indoor and outdoor) and volleyball; and co-ed sports include archery and cheerleading. Former sports included women's acrobatics & tumbling. Club sports include bass fishing and dance.

Overview
 3 NAIA football national championships (1991, 2000, and 2001)
 3 NAIA men's basketball national championships (1998, 2013, & 2019 )

Football

Accomplishments
 National Champions – 1991, 2000, 2001
 National Finalist – 1991, 1999, 2000, 2001, 2002
 National Semi-Finalist – 2004, 2011
 19 Mid-South Conference Champions – 1987, 1989, 1990, 1991, 1992, 1993, 1998, 1999, 2000, 2001, 2002, 2003, 2004, 2005, 2006, 2010, 2011, 2012, 2015
 NAIA National Coach of the Year – Bill Cronin – 2000, 2001

Men's basketball

Accomplishments
 38 appearances in NAIA National Tournament (Tournament Record)
 28 consecutive NAIA appearances (Tournament Record)
 57 wins in National Tournament History
 22 Sweet Sixteen appearances
 14 Elite Eight appearances
 12 Fab Four appearances
 7 National Title games
 3 National Championships

Notable alumni
 Billy Ray Cyrus – American country singer (attended, but did not graduate)

References

External links
 

 
Tigers